The Tallebudgera Creek is a creek located in South East Queensland, Australia.

Course and features

The Tallebudgera Creek rises from the Springbrook Plateau below Burleigh Mountain in the Springbrook National Park near Upper Tallebudgera and north of the New South Wales/Queensland border. The creek flows generally north by east through the Tallebudgera Valley towards  where it is crossed by the Pacific Motorway and the Gold Coast Highway, before reaching its mouth south of the Burleigh Head National Park and emptying into the Coral Sea. The creek descends  over its  course. The name Tallebudgera comes from the Yugambeh word "Jalubay-ngagam", which means "dingo's urine".

Tallebudgera Creek is known for good fishing. Bream, flathead, whiting and the bull shark are common species that are found in the creek.

As well as the main creek there is an extensive canal system, whose shores boast some of the Gold Coast's best housing. It is one of the Gold Coast's three main canal and creek systems, alongside the slightly smaller Currumbin Creek to the south and the much larger Nerang River to the north.

Dredging is carried out yearly in winter and spring to improve creek water quality and replenish sand on nearby Burleigh Beach.

History

The first bridge across the creek was opened in 1926. The road was then known as Main Ocean Road, later upgraded as the Pacific Highway and now known as the Gold Coast Highway.

The Tallebudgera Creek Dam was constructed on the creek in the 1950s as a water supply source for the lower Gold Coast. The dam was decommissioned during the 1970s. It appears that the dam was left for recreation purposes after decommissioning. In 2006, after two years of investigation, reports and public consultations, work commenced to upgrade the existing dam to the required dam safety standards.

See also

References

External links

Tallebudgera Creek Catchment

Rivers of Queensland
Geography of Gold Coast, Queensland
Tallebudgera, Queensland